Jalen Pokorn (born 7 June 1979) is a Slovenian former football midfielder.

International career
He has been capped 12 times for the Slovenian national team between 2004 and 2005.

Honours

Olimpija
Slovenian Cup: 1999–2000, 2002–03

Domžale
Slovenian PrvaLiga: 2007–08

See also
Slovenian international players

References

External links
Player profile at PrvaLiga 

1979 births
Living people
Sportspeople from Kranj
Slovenian footballers
Association football midfielders
NK Triglav Kranj players
NK Olimpija Ljubljana (1945–2005) players
Hapoel Nof HaGalil F.C. players
FK Atlantas players
FC Akhmat Grozny players
NK Domžale players
NK Celje players
Atromitos Yeroskipou players
Slovenian PrvaLiga players
NK Olimpija Ljubljana (2005) players
Slovenian expatriate footballers
Slovenian expatriate sportspeople in Russia
Expatriate footballers in Russia
Slovenian expatriate sportspeople in Israel
Expatriate footballers in Israel
Slovenian expatriate sportspeople in Cyprus
Expatriate footballers in Cyprus
Slovenian expatriate sportspeople in Austria
Expatriate footballers in Austria
Russian Premier League players
Israeli Premier League players
Cypriot Second Division players
Slovenia youth international footballers
Slovenia under-21 international footballers
Slovenia international footballers